Black River (also known as Black Creek or Black River Creek) is a tributary of Saucon Creek in Lehigh and Northampton counties in the US state of Pennsylvania. It is designated as a Coldwater Fishery and a Migratory Fishery and contains wild trout. The river is a very small limestone stream and flows in the vicinity of Lehigh University's Saucon Fields.

Course
The Black River begins on a hill in Upper Saucon Township, Lehigh County. It flows north-northeast for a few tenths of a mile, then continues north-northeast for several tenths of a mile as the border between Salisbury Township and Lower Saucon Township. It passes through an unnamed pond and then turns east for several tenths of a mile, entering Lower Saucon Township, Northampton County. It then heads in a southeasterly direction for over a mile, crossing Interstate 78. Eventually, it gradually turns northeast, passing through another pond before heading in an easterly direction and entering the city of Bethlehem. Some distance later, the river turns east-northeast for a few tenths of a mile before turning north for a few tenths of a mile and reaching its confluence with Saucon Creek.

Hydrology
Black River is not designated as an impaired waterbody.

At its mouth, the peak annual discharge has a 10 percent chance of reaching . It has a 2 percent chance of reaching  and a 1 percent chance of reaching . The peak annual discharge has a 0.2 percent chance of reaching .

In April 1959, measurements of Black River near a private road  from Wydnor found the creek's discharge to be .

Geography and geology

The Black River is described as a "miserable ditch" in Trout Unlimited's Guide to Pennsylvania Limestone Streams. It is a very small stream with only a trickle of stormwater runoff flowing through it. However, it is a limestone stream.

Watershed
The mouth of the river is in the United States Geological Survey quadrangle of Hellertown. However, its source is in the quadrangle of Allentown East. The mouth of the river is at Hellertown.

Most of the watershed of Black River is in Lower Saucon Township, Northampton County. However, smaller areas occupy parts of Upper Saucon Township, Lehigh County; Salisbury Township, Lehigh County; and Bethlehem, Northampton County. The northernmost corner of the river's watershed borders the southernmost part of Fountain Hill.

Black River flows in the vicinity of the Saucon Fields tract of Lehigh University's campus in some reaches.

History
Black River was entered into the Geographic Names Information System on August 2, 1979. Its identifier in the Geographic Names Information System is 1169729. The river is also known as Black Creek or Black River Creek. These variant names appear in Place Names of Northampton County, Pennsylvania, by James and Linda Wright, created in 1988.

A prestressed box beam or girders bridge carrying State Route 3003 was built over the river in 1959.

Biology
The drainage basin of the Black River is designated as a Coldwater Fishery and a Migratory Fishery. Wild trout naturally reproduce in the river from its headwaters downstream to its mouth. However, Trout Unlimited's Guide to Pennsylvania Limestone Streams said in 2000 that it was "not trout water".

In 2006, the Black River was identified as one of the places in the Saucon Creek watershed most in need of habitat restoration. The river has been affected by Lehigh University.

See also
 East Branch Saucon Creek, next tributary of Saucon Creek going downstream
 Silver Creek (Saucon Creek), next tributary of Saucon Creek going upstream
 List of rivers of Pennsylvania

References

Tributaries of Saucon Creek